Fred McBride (June 20, 1905 – death date unknown) was an American Negro league first baseman between 1931 and 1940.

A native of Groveton, Texas, McBride made his Negro leagues debut in 1931 with the Indianapolis ABCs. He went on to play for the Birmingham Black Barons in 1940. He also played for the independent Texas Black Spiders in 1939.

References

External links
  and Seamheads

1905 births
Year of death missing
Place of death missing
Birmingham Black Barons players
Indianapolis ABCs (1931–1933) players
Date of death unknown
Baseball first basemen
Baseball players from Texas
People from Groveton, Texas